was a Fudai feudal domain under the Tokugawa shogunate of  Edo period Japan.  It was located in southeastern Ōmi Province, in the Kansai region of central Honshu. The domain was centered at Miyagawa jin'ya, located in what is now the city of  Nagahama in Shiga Prefecture.

History
Hotta Masamori was a general under Tokugawa Ieyasu and a high-ranking retainer of Tokugawa Iemitsu. He rose to the position of daimyō of Sakura Domain (110,000 koku). However, his son, Hota Masanobu came into conflict with the rōjū and his domain was confiscated in 1660. Masanobu's son, Hotta Masayasu, was pardoned in 1682 and allowed to return to the ranks of the daimyō, albeit as daimyō of Yoshii Domain in Kōzuke Province with a kokudaka of only 10,000 koku. He was transferred to Miyagawa in northern Ōmi Province in 1698, which marks the start of Ōmi-Miyagawa Domain. Under the 3rd daimyō, Hotta Masanobu, in 1748 the domain gained an additional 3000 koku. Under the 5th daimyō, Hotta Masatane 3600 koku in Ōmi were exchanged for an equivalent fief in Harima Province; however, the lands in Harima proved to be far more productive and the domain benefitted from this exchange. The 6th daimyō, Hotta Masatami with a cultural figure and a noted painter. 

During the Bakumatsu period, the domain initially sided with the shogunate, but facing pressure from all surrounding domains who supported the Emperor, quickly changed sides at the start of the Boshin War. As with all domains, Miyakawa Domain was abolished in 1870 with the abolition of the han system. It subsequently was incorporated into Nagahama Prefecture, Inukami Prefecture, and then Shiga Prefecture. Hotta Masayasu, the final daimyō, was subsequently ennobled with the kazoku peerage title of viscount and served in the Meiji government as Minister of Communications.

Bakumatsu period holdings
As with most domains in the han system, Miyagawa Domain consisted of a discontinuous territories calculated to provide the assigned kokudaka, based on periodic cadastral surveys and projected agricultural yields.

Ōmi Province
4 villages in Shiga District
3 villages in Yasu District
5 villages in  Kōka District
5 villages in Gamō District
3 villages in Echi District
16 villages in Sakata District

List of daimyō
  Hotta clan (Fudai) 1698-1871

See also
List of Han

References
The content of this article was largely derived from that of the corresponding article on Japanese Wikipedia.

*

Notes

Domains of Japan
History of Shiga Prefecture
Ōmi Province
Nagahama, Shiga